Fuck with Fire is a studio album by the band Planes Mistaken for Stars, released in 2001.

Critical reception
The Chicago Reader wrote: "Sinister, gravelly, and coated in sheets of sonic raunch, Fuck With Fire is planted firmly in the burgeoning early-aughts posthardcore scene, with one foot in the anthemic beard-rock of Hot Water Music, Small Brown Bike, and Against Me! and the other in the blistering metalcore of Converge and Botch." Decibel called the album an "un-fuckwithable masterstroke." Jason Heller, in The A.V. Club, wrote that it "still holds up as one of the most excruciatingly honest, sickeningly sludgy expressions of post-hardcore circa the early 21st century."

Track listing

Personnel

Band
 Gared O'Donnell - vocals, guitar
 Matt Bellinger - guitar, vocals
 Jamie Drier - bass
 Mike Ricketts - drums

Production
 Brendan Gamble

References

2001 albums
Planes Mistaken for Stars albums